The 2019 European Road Cycling Championships was the 25th running of the European Road Cycling Championships, that took place from 7 to 11 August 2019 in Alkmaar, the Netherlands. The event consisted of a total of 6 road races and 7 time trials, including the introduction of the new mixed team relay, regulated by the Union Européenne de Cyclisme (UEC).

Location 
The organization was initially awarded to Annecy, France, but the organisers there wanted different dates due to the busy tourism season in August and eventually returned the assignment. The UEC then asked the Dutch province of Drenthe to organise the European Championships, after their bid to organize the World Championships was rejected. In January there were several Dutch cities in the running, of which one fell after the other. There was not enough support in Emmen, the national championships are being held in Ede this year and Den Bosch said it had never been an official candidate. In February Alkmaar was the only one left, after which the organization was definitively awarded on 25 March.

Race Schedule
All times are in CEST (UTC+2).

Elite

Under 23

Junior

Mixed Team Relay

Overall medal table

References

External links 
 Official website Alkmaar 2019
 UEC 2019 Road European Championships

European Road Championships by year
European Road Championships, 2019
Road
International cycle races hosted by the Netherlands
European Road Championships
Cycling in Alkmaar